Desher Maati is an Indian Bengali television drama series that premiered on 4 January 2021 on Bengali General Entertainment Channel Star Jalsha, and is also available on the digital platform Disney+ Hotstar. It aired its last episode on 31 October 2021. The show is produced by Magic Moments Motion Pictures of Saibal Banerjee and Leena Gangopadhyay, and stars Shruti Das, Dibyojyoti Dutta, Rukma Roy, Rahul Banerjee, Tathagata Mukherjee and Payel De in lead roles whereas Rita Dutta Chakraborty, Bharat Kaul and Anindita Raychaudhury among others in prominent supporting roles.

Plot
It is a family drama with a romantic element. Its central theme is to stay connected with your roots and uplift family values. The story revolves around how Mukherjee family members who returns to Swarupnagar rediscover themselves.

Cast

Main
 Shruti Das as Noa Bose Mukherjee - A teacher and Kiyaan's Wife, Dodo, Mampi, Neelpakhi and Dimpi's younger sister-in-law
 Dibyojyoti Dutta as Dr. Dibyangshu Mukherjee aka Kiyaan - UK returned doctor, Noa's husband, Dodo, Mampi, Neelpakhi, Dimpi's paternal cousin
 Rukma Roy as Rai Mukherjee Banerjee aka Mampi - a PhD student, Kiyaan, Neelpakhi and Dimpi's elder paternal cousin sister, Dodo's younger sister,  Raja's wife
 Rahul Banerjee as Dr. Rajrup Banerjee aka Raja - an orphan raised by Amitra Shekhar, a doctor, Mampi's husband, Dodo's close friend and Kiyaan, Neelpakhi and Dimpi's brother-in-law
 Tathagata Mukherjee as Sourangshu Mukherjee aka Dodo - a journalist, Kiyaan, Neelpakhi and Dimpi's elder paternal cousin brother, Ujjwaini's husband, Raja's close friend and Mampi's brother
 Payel De as Ujjwaini Mukherjee - a journalist, Dodo's wife, Kiyaan, Mampi, Neelpakhi and Dimpi's elder sister-in-law

Recurring

 Ashok Bhattacharya "Swapan Kumar" as Amitra Shekhar Mukherjee - Kiyaan's paternal grandfather, a retired teacher
 Anashua Majumdar as Sharmila Mukherjee - Kiyaan's paternal grandmother
 Shankar Chakraborty as Shramanjit Mukherjee - a renowned and wealthy writer, Shubhalakshmi's estranged husband, Shrishti's husband, Neelpakhi's father, Kiyaan's elder paternal uncle
 Rita Dutta Chakraborty as Shubhalakshmi Mukherjee aka "Bourani" - a music teacher, Kiyaan's elder aunt, Shramanjit's estranged first wife, Neelpakhi's step/adoptive mother
 Bharat Kaul as Dr. Bikramjit Mukherjee aka Bikram - a doctor, Kiyaan's foster father
 Suchismita Chowdhury as Antara Mukherjee - Kiyaan's mother
 Diganta Bagchi as Chandrajit Mukherjee aka Chandu - a lawyer, Kiyaan's younger paternal uncle, Dodo and Mampi's father
 Anindita Saha as Mousumi Mukherjee - Kiyaan's younger aunt, Dodo and Mampi's mother
 Animesh Bhaduri as Ratnajit Mukherjee aka Ratno - a college professor, Kiyaan's youngest paternal uncle, Dimpi's father
 Shampa Banerjee as Kankana Mukherjee - Kiyaan's youngest aunt, Dimpi's mother
 Sairity Banerjee as Neelpakhi Mukherjee - Shramanjit and Shrishti's daughter, Kiyaan's younger paternal cousin sister, has one-sided feelings for her brother-in-law Raja
 Ashmee Ghosh as Tathoi Mukherjee aka Dimpi - Kiyaan's youngest paternal cousin sister

 Bhaskar Banerjee as Abin Bose - Noa's father, a teacher
 Anindita Raychaudhury as Rupali Bose - Noa's mother

 Ananya Das as Dr. Payel Sen - Kiyaan's ex-girlfriend
 Debottam Majumder as Shibnath Das aka Shibu - a local goon of Swarupnagar
 Saswati Majumder as Noa's friend and Shubhalakshmi's student
 Monalisa Paul as Dr. Kripa Basu - Raja's former batchmate who falsely accused him of molesting her on Chandu's insistence
 Prasun Bannerji as SP Abhimanyu Sen - Antara's former love interest, Kiyaan's biological father

Reception

Ratings

References

Bengali-language television programming in India
2021 Indian television series debuts
2021 Indian television series endings
Star Jalsha original programming